Arakaninihi Island is a small island in the Northland Region of New Zealand. It lies off Taiharuru Head, directly east of Whangarei.

See also

 List of islands of New Zealand
 List of islands
 Desert island

References

Uninhabited islands of New Zealand
Whangarei District
Islands of the Northland Region